Rathbunaster is a monospecific genus of sea stars belonging to the family Asteriidae. The genus name was given by Fisher as a honorific of the starfish biologist Richard Rathbun of the Smithsonian Institution. He originally ranged this genus under the family Pycnopididae, synonymous with Asteriidae.

Rathbunaster californicusFisher, 1906, common name California sun star, is a sea star belonging to the phylum Echinodermata and the class Asteroidea. It has a maximum size of about 45 centimeters in diameter.  The average weight of the star is 35 g, lives between sixty and a thousand meters in-depth, and lives on the muddy benthic substrate. The surface of the star contains many spikes containing pincers. When something swims and lands on top of the California sun star, those pincers can grab onto the prey and capture the prey; then, the star will then grab the prey and eat it.

Description
Original description:

It resembles closely Pycnopodia Stimpson, but differing in having a smaller disk, with the rays constricted at base and easily detachable. In the entire absence of rudimentary annular or calcareous ridges at the base of the ray, in the abortion of alternate supermarginal plates beyond the base of theray, and in the small widely spaced inferomarginals each bearing a slender spine; in the greater prominence of the adambulacral plates which are placed on the same level with the inferomarginals (and each with a single spine as in Pycnopodia); in the less crowded condition of the ambulacral ossicles.

The circular isolated plates on abactinal surface of rays are more numerous than in Pycnopodia and each bears a wreathed spine, whereas in Pycnopodia spines are rare on abactinal plates of arm. There are no large bivalved pedicellariae as in Pycnopodia. Tube-feet quadriserial except at extremity and base of ray where they are biserial. Ambulacral plates being less crowded, the tube feet are really intermediate in arrangement between the biserial and quadriserial type. Mouth plates are more prominent than in Pycnopodia and approach in form the type common to Brisingidae. The actinostome is wide, like the Brisingidae.

Distribution 
Rathbunaster californicus lives along the west coast of North America and ranges from southern California to southern Alaska. It is found in muddy substrates in the deep ocean/benthic environments. The star's distribution ranges from ninety nine to seven hundred sixty eight meters in depth.

Anatomy and body plan 
The California sun star has pentaradial symmetry. Pentaradial symmetry means if the star were cut into 5, each section would be the same. It has 15 arms, all centered around a central disk. In its larval stage, it exhibits bilateral symmetry. Instead, one surface is considered the oral and aboral surface. The oral surface consists of the mouth and tubular feet, while the aboral surface consists of the anus. 

The endoskeleton of the California sun star is made up of calcareous ossicles, which are covered in a thin layer of the ciliated tissue. The inside of the star is composed of the water vascular system, which is a complex system of fluid-filled canals within the star. 

The California sun star, like other members of Echinodermata, has tubular feet. These tubular feet are filled by the water vascular system. These tube feet serve the purpose of locomotion and help in feeding, gas exchange, and attachment to the surface. The tubular feet are also part of the nervous system. The nervous system in the California sun star is decentralized and has no cerebral ganglion. A lot of evidence shows that this nervous system can respond to touch, light, and water currents and shows the potential of having complex behavior.

Diet and digestion 
Rathbunaster californicus is a carnivore and a decomposer. It feeds on crustaceans, worms, detritus, and occasionally fish using its pincers on its aboral side. Due to the majority of its prey being benthic, a lot of sediment is found in the California sun stars stomach. This sea star is known to be one of the main decomposers in the deep ocean and is known to be the main decomposer when a whale falls in the Monterey Canyon off the coast of California. The stomach has strong digestive enzymes, and the California sun star is able to start digesting the organism before it even enters its digestive system. The digestive glands extend into the arms and are short.

Reproduction 
Rathbunaster californicus exhibits both asexual and sexual reproduction. If split in half, both halves will grow into two identical California sun stars. Sexually, the California sun star releases gametes into the water column. Gametes from male and female stars will meet in the water column, and the gamete is fertilized externally. During the embryonic stage, it is considered a deuterostome due to the anus forming from the blastopore, radial cleavage, and the archenteron developing from the coelom.

Ecological impact 
The California sun star is a very important species in its ecosystems. It is one of the most abundant sea stars along the west coast of the United States and the most abundant star in the Monterey Canyon. The sea star plays multiple important ecological roles, such as it eats a variety of organisms and helping keep those organisms from overpopulating. The sea star also is a deep water decomposer and helps recycle nutrients and sequester carbon into the sediments.

Parasite 
In the Monterey Canyon, Rathbunaster californicus has been found to be infected with a parasite. This parasite resembles Asterophila japonica, which is an endoparasitic gastropod. However, it is unknown. The unknown parasite could potentially be a new species of an endoparasitic gastropod. What is known is that this parasite is a member of Eulimidae. A main characteristic of Eulimidae is that they attach to the host permanently. Asterophila japonica attaches to the column of Rathbunaster californicus. The adult form of the parasite is visible as a lump in skin of Rathbunaster californicus.

References

Bibliography
 Lauerman, L.M.L. (1998). Diet and feeding behavior of the deep-water sea star Rathbunaster californicus (Fisher) in the Monterey submarine canyon. Bulletin of Marine Science 63(3): 523-530

External links
 Fisher, W.K. (1906). New starfishes from the Pacific Coast of North America. Proceedings of the Washington Academy of Sciences. 8: 111-139.
 Fisher, W.K. (1928). Asteroidea of the North Pacific and adjacent waters. Part 2. Forcipulata (part). Bulletin of the United States National Museum. 76: 1-245
 The Echinoblog: Rathbunaster californicus

 Asteriidae
Monotypic echinoderm genera